Maxwell Ansah may refer to:
 Maxwell Owusu Ansah, known by his stage name Lethal Bizzle, British rapper
 Maxwell Ansah (footballer), Ghanaian footballer